Tuscola, Kentucky was an unincorporated community located on Little Cat Fork in Lawrence County, Kentucky, identified with a post office by that name established in 1902.

History
A post office was first established at or close to the mouth of Spring Branch on Little Cat Fork in 1885 as "Cat P.O.," but was discontinued in March 1891. A 1902 petition to establish the post office as Tuscola located it two and three quarter miles northwest of Olioville, three and a quarter miles southeast of Glenwood, and three and three quarter miles west of Vessie. Little Cat Fork, also called Little Catt or Catts, is a fork of Cat Creek, a tributary of Blaine Creek in the Big Sandy River watershed.

In 1940, a site change was petitioned for, relocating it one mile east to a point 100 yards north of Little Catt Creek five miles west of Fallsburg.  The post office was again discontinued in 1941, and the name fell into disuse, with the former name "Cat" returning to prominence due to the location on Little Cat Fork.

The name "Tuscola" is thought to be derived from the Muskogean word "tushka" meaning warrior.

References

Unincorporated communities in Kentucky
Lawrence County, Kentucky